Stenotus may refer to:
 Stenotus (bug), a bug genus in the family Miridae
 Stenotus (plant), a plant genus in the family Asteraceae